WLC or wlc may refer to:

Education 
Warrior Leader Course (now known as Basic Leader Course or BLC), a course of study for non-commissioned officers in the US Army
West London College (1977-2017), an independent college of further and higher education
Wisconsin Lutheran College, a liberal arts college affiliated with the Wisconsin Evangelical Lutheran Synod
Woods Learning Center, an academic program in Casper, Wyoming

Sporting 
World Lacrosse Championship, international men's field lacrosse championship
World Lethwei Championship, Martial arts promotion
World Logging Championship, a competition between foresters

Technology 
Weighted least-connection, a scheduling algorithm used by load balancing software such as Linux Virtual Server
Live Mesh (formerly Windows Live Core), a data synchronization system for computing devices
Windows Live Calendar, a time-management web application by Microsoft as part of its Windows Live services
Wireless LAN Controller, computer networking device
Wireless charging (a.k.a. inductive charging) of mobile devices

Other uses 

Waltham Cross railway station, Hertfordshire (National Rail station code)
West Lothian Council, a Scottish local authority
Westminster Larger Catechism, a central catechism of Calvinists in the English tradition
Westminster Leningrad Codex, one of the oldest manuscripts of the complete Hebrew Bible
White-lined chipboard, a paperboard grade
William Lane Craig, an American philosopher of religion and Christian apologist
World Lotto Corporation, an official European lottery site and platinum marketing partner of the International Lottery in Liechtenstein Foundation
Worm-like chain, a model in polymer physics
Comorian language, Mwali dialect